Bryan Robinson may refer to:
Bryan Robinson (American football, born 1974) (1974–2016), player of American football (defensive end)
Bryan Robinson (gridiron football, born 1986), player of American football (defensive tackle)
Bryan E. Robinson (born 1945), American writer and psychotherapist
Bryan Robinson (judge) (1808–1887), Irish-born lawyer, judge and politician in Newfoundland
Bryan Robinson (physician) (1680–1754), Regius Professor of Physic at Dublin

See also 
Brian Robinson (disambiguation)